KYJC 91.3 FM is a radio station licensed to Commerce, Texas.  The station broadcasts a Christian talk and teaching format and is owned by Penfold Communications, Inc.

References

External links
KYJC's official website

YJC